The Aberconway Medal is a medal of the Geological Society of London, formerly awarded annually by the Institution of Geologists but since that Institution's merger with the Geological Society in 1991 it has been awarded biennially by that society.  The award was made with a gift from English China Clays and its chairman Charles McLaren, 3rd Baron Aberconway.

It is normally awarded to persons with no more than 25 years full-time equivalent experience and to recognise distinction in the practice of geology with special reference to work in industry.

Aberconway Medallists 
Source: Geological Society

Awarded by the Institution of Geologists

Awarded by the Geological Society

See also

 List of geology awards

References

London awards
Geology awards
Awards of the Geological Society of London
British science and technology awards